Richard A. Weinberg is an American developmental psychologist.

Weinberg was born in Chicago, Illinois in 1943. He received his undergraduate education at the University of Wisconsin–Madison. For most of his career, Weinberg has taught at the University of Minnesota after earning his Ph.D there in 1968. He is known for his Minnesota Transracial Adoption Study with Sandra Scarr. This study concluded that "rather than the home environment having a cumulative impact across development, its influence wanes from early childhood to adolescence."

Weinberg has served on the board of directors of the American Psychological Association and the American Psychological Society. With Richard M. Lerner and Celia Fisher, he was a founding editor of Applied Developmental Science.

Publications 

Boehm AE, Weinberg RA. The Classroom Observer: Developing Observation Skills in Early Childhood Settings. Teachers College Press; 3rd edition (1996). 
Lamb ME et al. (eds). Applied Developmental Science: Special Issue : The Effects of Quality Care on Child Development. Lawrence Erlbaum Associates (2000). 
Child Psychology in Retrospect and Prospect: In Celebration of the 75th Anniversary of the Institute of Child Development (Minnesota Symposia on Child Psychology). Lawrence Erlbaum Associates (2002). 
Zeldin S et al. (eds). Applied Developmental Science: Promoting Adolescent Development in Community Contexr : Challenges to Scholars, Nonprofit Managers, and Higher Education (Applied Developmental Science). Lawrence Erlbaum Associates (2000).

References

External links 
Richard A. Weinberg profile via University of Minnesota

21st-century American psychologists
American developmental psychologists
Living people
Race and intelligence controversy
University of Minnesota alumni
Date of birth missing (living people)
University of Minnesota faculty
1943 births
Scientists from Chicago
University of Wisconsin–Madison alumni
Academic journal editors
20th-century American psychologists